The Brokmerland is a landscape and an historic territory, located in western East Frisia, which covers the area in and around the present-day communities of Brookmerland and Südbrookmerland. The Brokmerland borders in the east on the Harlingerland and in the north on the Norderland. The historic Brokmerland is usually written with only one "o". Occasionally one also finds the spelling "Broekmerland" ("oe" pronounced as a long "o"), while today's communities have chosen to spell the name with a double "o".

Etymology 
The name comes from the Old Frisian and Old Low German word brōk, which meant a  moor-like carr landscape that had been very sparsely settled. It stretched from the western edge of the East Frisian geest ridge, from the Ley (Norder Tief) to the Flumm (Fehntjer Tief), and was characterised by numerous shallow lakes from the Großes Meer to the Sandwater. The suffix mer is derived from mann (i.e. "man") with the possessive suffix -er.

History 
Until the early Middle Ages the Brokmerland was largely uninhabited and provided a natural boundary between the Federgau and the Emsgau on one side and the provinces of Norditi (Norderland) and Östringen on the other side. This boundary also played a role in church history because it was the dividing line between the Diocese of Münster (Federgau and Emsgau) and the Archdiocese of Bremen (Norderland and Östringen).

Archaeological finds suggest a sparse population in the period up to 800 AD. The population grew from about 1100, firstly because the construction of dykes in the region was completed and, secondly, because the "Julian Flood" of 1164 forced many people to flee inland from the coast. In addition, the population increased in the High Middle Ages, which resulted the sparsely populated or unsettled areas of East Frisia being opened up by land development, a process known as internal colonization. As a result of this, the Brokmerland was reclaimed for agriculture by settlers from the Krummhörn Marsh as well as the Norder and Aurich Geest. In the 11 and 12th centuries new settlements and the first churches were built here on the edge and the outliers of the geest. The result of this process were the ribbon villages (Reihendörfer) with their right (called Upstrecken) to claim land into the moor until they reached someone else's land.

The Brokmers are mentioned for the first time in the Östringen (Rastede) chronicles of 1148, which may indicate that by this time they had attained a certain importance. From 1251 the Brokmänner then appear as inhabitants of an independent territory, the Brokmerland, which was initially divided into three intermediate districts, each with two mother churches: Marienhafe and Engerhafe, Wiegsboldsbur and Burhafe (now isolated farms in the Victorbur Marsh), Bedekaspel and Südwolde (Blaukirchen). The church districts belonged to the Diocese of Münster. The main place of assembly of the Brokmann to begin with was probably the Wiegboldsbur Church.

In the course of the 13th century the Brokmerland experienced its heyday. The construction of great churches was carried out during this time, of which the (formerly three-aisled) Marienhafe Church is the largest. At that time she was even the largest church in northwest Germany and even in 1462 Pope Pius II paid an indulgence for visiting the church, for donations towards furniture, as well as monetary donations for the preservation of the Church "curia beate Marie". The Bishop of Münster acknowledged the growing importance of the area in the middle of the 13th century by granting the church its own diocese. Previously, it had been assigned to the dean's office of Uttum and Hinte. In addition, the bishop built a castle in Fehnhusen in the parish of Engerhafe, later called the Oldeborg and which formed the nucleus of the modern village.

The Frisian territories had a consulate constitution under which the consuls and judges were elected by the people for one year. Political leadership and the judiciary were directly in the hands of the population. Every year, meetings were held by the representative of the seven Frisian maritime territories (Seelande). The Upstalsboom from that period is still a popular meeting place today. The Brokmerland had its own jurisdiction and, in the Brokmerbrief, its own constitution as well. This document acts as the most detailed source of Frisian law from the territorial and judicial constitution in Brokmerland, whose law was based on the collective will of the people.

At the end of the 13th century, Auricherland joined the Brokmerland and formed the fourth region in its territory. After the end of the reign of the tom Brok chieftains in 1450, the Auricherland separated again from Brokmerland.

Chieftain rule 

This consulate constitution lasted until the middle of the 14th century. It then disintegrated and was gradually replaced, as the powerful families took over the chieftainship. In the Bokmerland this was the family of Kenesma, which in the second half of the 14th century was awarded the chieftainship in the Brokmerland. Later, they renamed themselves into the tom Broks and built the castle of Brooke next to the existing episcopal castle in Oldeborg. Later, the tom Broks built a second castle in Aurich.

The capital, Marienhafe, developed at this time to an important trading centre. After severe floods in 1374 and 1377 it even became the seaport. Thus the possibility arose of goods from the Brookmerland being transported by water to the Münsterland. The Wadden mudflats of Leybucht and Kuipersand in front of Marienhafe take their name from the old three-aisle Marienhafe mother church. Its roof was covered on its north side with copper (Kuiper = Frisian-Dutch for copper) and on the south side with slate (Ley = old German for slate), so that, from the sea, the changing view of the church with its copper and slate sides acted as a seamark to guide the experienced sailor along the permanently navigable tidal inlet and other stretches of waterway, even at low tide.  Without this local knowledge, the place and its tide-dependent harbour were virtually unapproachable from the sea.

In the late 14th Century pirates under Klaus Störtebeker were sheltered in Marienhafe. As a result he returned the favour in the battle for East Frisia by the chieftains of Brookmerland. Widzel tom Brok had opened the then relatively new port to the Likedeelers or "Victual Brothers" under Klaus Störtebeker. They used the place as a safe haven for stashing their booty and for selling it. This was finally stopped by several punitive expeditions by Hamburg, which took action against the pirates and those chieftains sympathizing with them. Marienhafe was saved  from destruction because of its safe harbour. Faldern and Larrelt near Emden and other East Frisian buildings were destroyed however.

The tom Broks initially tried with some success to establish a territory across Frisia on both sides of the River Ems. Ocko II finally inherited such a large domain, that he could be titled the Chieftain of East Frisia. In the period that followed there were disputes between Focko Ukena and Ocko tom Brok, however, that spilled over into open conflict. After Ukena's initial victory over Ocko II at Detern in 1426 Focko allied himself with the Bischop of Münster and numerous East Frisian chieftains against Ocko who was now confined to the Brokmerland and finally defeated him on 28 October at the Wild Fields. He was taken to Leer and was imprisoned there for four years. In 1435 he died, powerless, as the last of his line in Norden.

The reign of Focko Ukena in the Brokmerland that followed turned out to be only a short-term interlude. Having just escaped from the yoke of tom Brok, many of the people felt betrayed by the new rulers, because, like the tom Broks, they appeared not to honour Frisian freedom. As a result there was a revolt around 1430 in the Brookmerland (today's spelling), which after an unsuccessful attack by Focko on the town of Bremen by the Lower Weser, spread into a general uprising by the East Frisia people.

On 14 November 1430 after the conquest of Oldersum and Aurich, the East Frisian territorial alliances (Landesverbände)  and lesser chieftains, led by Chieftain Edzard Cirksena from Greetsiel, formed the Freedom League of the Seven East Frisian States. In 1440, the Cirksena, then judges and "guardians", became the chieftains of the Brookmerland and Auricherland and had finally begun there, after Ukena's brief reign, the line of the tom Broks. They had, however, to take into consideration municipal freedom (Gemeindefreiheit) and provincial law. The country's municipalities had reconstituted themselves. For example, there was once again a Brookmerland, an Auricherland and even a separate (Bangsted, Ochtelbur, Riepe and Simonswolde).

in 1464, when the Cirksena were elevated to imperial counts, they turned the areas controlled by their castles into districts (Ämter): from then on the Brookmerland, along with the Auricherland, belonged to district (Amt) of Aurich and was divided into the Vogtei of Nordbrookmer, with Osteel, Marienhafe and Siegelsum, and the Vogtei of Südbrookmer with the parishes of Engerhafe, Victorbur, Wiegboldsbur, Bedekaspel and Forlitz-Blaukirchen. Subsequently Brookmerland shared the fate of the County.

References

History of East Frisia